6-Methoxymellein is a dihydroisocoumarin, a phenolic compound found in carrots and carrot purées. It is responsible for bitterness in carrots. It is a phytoalexin, induced in carrot slices by UV-C, that allows resistance to Botrytis cinerea and other microorganisms.

Biosynthesis 
6-Methoxymellein is formed from S-adenosyl methionine and 6-hydroxymellein by the enzyme 6-hydroxymellein O-methyltransferase with secondary production of S-adenosylhomocysteine.

References

External links 
 6-Methoxymellein on www.biocyc.org

Dihydroisocoumarins
Bitter compounds
Phytoalexins
Lactones